A son is a male offspring in relation to a parent.

Son, SON, Sons, The Son, or The Sons or may also refer to:

Places 
 Son, Ardennes, a commune in the Ardennes, France
 Son, Netherlands, a village in the Netherlands
 Son, Norway, a village in Norway
 Santo-Pekoa International Airport in Vanuatu, IATA Code SON
 Saugeen Ojibway Nation, a group of First Nations in Canada
 Son River (Vietnam), a river in Vietnam
 Son River (also Sone), a tributary of the Ganges in central India

People 
 Son (Korean surname), a common Korean family name
 Thế Sơn, Vietnamese-American singer
 Francisco Javier Hidalgo Gómez, Spanish footballer known as 'Son'

Arts and entertainment

Films 
 The Son (1953 film), a Danish family film
 Son (1955 film), a 1955 Soviet drama film
 Sons, 1989 film directed by Alexandre Rockwell
 Sons (1996 film), a Chinese film directed by Zhang Yuan
 The Son (2002 film), directed by Jean-Pierre Dardenne and Luc Dardenne
 Sons (2006 film), a Norwegian film directed by Eric Richter Strand
 Son (2008 film), a short film
 The Son (2019 Argentine film), with Joaquín Furriel
 The Son (2019 Bosnia and Herzegovina film)
 Son (2021 film), an Irish horror film
 The Son (2022 film), a drama film by Florian Zeller

Television 
 Son (TV series), Turkey
 The Son (TV series), based on the novel of the same name by Philipp Meyer
 "The Son" (Friday Night Lights), in the Friday Night Lights TV drama series

Literature 
 Son (novel), a 2012 book by Lois Lowry
 Sons (novel), a novel by Pearl S. Buck
 Son: A Psychopath and his Victims, a 1983 novel by Jack Olsen
 The Son (Meyer novel), a 2013 novel by Philipp Meyer
 The Son (Nesbø novel), a novel by Jo Nesbø.
 The Son (Hasenclever play), a 1914 play by Walter Hasenclever
 The Son (Zeller play), a 2018 play by Florian Zeller
 The Sons, a collection of stories by Franz Kafka

Music

Styles 
 Son (music), a Cuban musical style
 Son, a rhythm of Colombian vallenato music
 Mexican Son music, a folk music category

Groups and labels 
 Son (band), a Canadian alternative rock band
 Sons (band), formerly Sons of God, an Oklahoma rock band
 The Sons (band), a British alternative rock band
 Sons Ltd, an independent record label from Great Britain

Albums 
 Son (Katya Chilly album)
 Son (Juana Molina album), 2006
 Son (Toiling Midgets album)

Songs 
"Son", by Baboon from Something Good Is Going to Happen to You

Fictional characters 

 The Son, a character in the Star Wars universe

Religion 
 Korean Seon or Sŏn Buddhism
 God the Son or The Son, in Christianity

Science and technology 
 SON (gene), a gene and the protein that it encodes
 SON, a type of high pressure sodium vapor lamp
 Self-organizing network
 Small-Outline No leads (SON), a Quad Flat No-leads package for integrated circuit
 Supraoptic nucleus, a body of cells in the hypothalamus

Other uses 
 Son (political party), a Galician political party created in 2015
 Socked on the nose in philately, with centered postmark
 Songhay languages, son in ISO 639-2 and ISO 639-5
 Óðrerir and Són, container of Nordic mythical mead of poetry

See also 
 Sun (disambiguation)